Aakhri Insaaf is a 1980 Indian Hindi-language film directed by Kalidas, starring  Ashok Kumar, Mithun Chakraborty, Rameshwari, Zarina Wahab, Vijayendra Ghatge, Pradeep Kumar.

Cast
Ashok Kumar
Mithun Chakraborty
Zarina Wahab
Rameshwari
Vijayendra Ghatge
Pradeep Kumar

Soundtrack

External links
 

1980 films
1980s Hindi-language films
Films scored by Rajesh Roshan